Ali ibn Yahya was the penultimate Zirid ruler of Ifriqiya, in 1116–1121 CE.

Life
Ali inherited the throne from his father, Yahya ibn Tamim, in 1116. He planned to launch attacks on the Italo-Norman Kingdom of Sicily, and sought the aid of the Almoravids for the purpose. This led to a series of clashes with the Normans in the decades after his death and culminating in the capture of the Zirid capital, Mahdia, in 1148. Ali's son, Abu'l-Hasan al-Hasan, was thus the last Zirid ruler.

References

Sources
 

1121 deaths
Zirid emirs of Ifriqiya
12th-century Berber people
12th-century rulers in Africa
12th-century people of Ifriqiya